Oricia truncata is a moth of the family Notodontidae. It is found from Mexico south to Panama.

The larvae feed on Rinorea squamata.

References

Moths described in 1854
Notodontidae